Madagascar first entered the Olympic Games in 1964 and has sent athletes to every games apart from 1976 and 1988. The largest group the country ever sent to an Olympic games was 10 in 2000. They have never won a medal. Jean-Louis Ravelomanantsoa reached the final of the men's 100 metres in the 1968 Summer Olympics and finished eighth.

Madagascar appeared for the Winter Games for the first time in 2006 and did not compete again until 2018.

Medal tables

Medals by Summer Games

Medals by Winter Games

See also
 List of flag bearers for Madagascar at the Olympics
 Tropical nations at the Winter Olympics
 Madagascar at the Paralympics

References

External links
 
 
 

 
Olympics